William Koch may refer to:

 William Frederick Koch (1885–1967), American medical doctor and pharmaceutical entrepreneur
 William C. Koch Jr. (born 1947), former justice of the Tennessee Supreme Court

See also
Bill Koch (disambiguation), for those people known as "Bill" or "Billy"